Events from the year 1910 in Italy.

Kingdom of Italy
Monarch – Victor Emmanuel III (1900–1946)
Prime Minister – 
 Sidney Sonnino (1909–1910)
 Luigi Luzzatti (1910–1911)
Population – 34,751,000

Events

March
 March 21 – Prime Minister Sidney Sonnino resigns. Luigi Luzzatti is asked to form a new government.
 March 31 – Luzzatti's new government is accepted by the Italian Chamber of Deputies.

April
 April 4–5 – Former U.S. President Theodore Roosevelt visits Rome and dines with the King.

May
 May 5 – In Milan, the General Confederation of Italian Industry, commonly known as Confindustria, the Italian employers' federation and national chamber of commerce is founded.

June
 June 5 – By a narrow majority, the national leadership of the Italian Socialist Party (PSI) decides to support the new government.
 June 7 – An earthquake hits the Province of Avellino and the town of Calitri in particular.

October
 October 21 – The 11th National Congress of the Italian Socialist Party (PSI) is held in Milan, dominated by the conflict between the reformist wing and the intransigent wing of the left. Leonida Bissolati and Ivanoe Bonomi attack Filippo Turati from the right, while Giuseppe Emanuele Modigliani and Gaetano Salvemini criticize from the left. At the far left is Benito Mussolini who is participating for the first time at the national party congress.

December
 December 3 – The first Nationalist Congress is held in Florence after which the Italian Nationalist Association (Associazione Nazionalista Italiana, ANI) is founded under the influence of Italian nationalists such as Enrico Corradini and Giovanni Papini. Upon its formation, the ANI supported the repatriation of Austrian held Italian-populated lands to Kingdom of Italy and was willing to endorse war with Austria-Hungary to do so.

Sports
 April 3 – The French rider Eugène Christophe wins the 4th Milan–San Remo bicycle race.
 May 1 – Internazionale from Milan wins the 1909–10 Italian Football Championship.
 May 15 – 
 The first game of the Italy's national football team. In Milan, Italy defeats France by a score of 6–2. Some turmoil kept the players of Pro Vercelli who were the best team of the league, out of the game. At the end of the match, the players received some cigarette packets thrown by the 4,000 spectators as a prize.
 Tullio Cariolato wins the 1910 Targa Florio endurance automobile race on Sicily driving a Franco.
 May 18–June 5 – The Italian rider Carlo Galetti wins the second Giro d'Italia stage bicycle race.
 November 6 – The Italian rider Giovanni Micheletto wins the 6th Giro di Lombardia bicycle race.

Births
 January 16 – Mario Tobino, Italian poet, writer and psychiatrist (d. 1991)
 March 5 – Ennio Flaiano, Italian screenwriter, playwright, novelist, journalist and drama critic (d. 1972)
 March 25 – Magda Olivero, Italian soprano (d. 2014)
 April 24 – Pupella Maggio, Italian actress (d. 1999)
 May 12 – Giulietta Simionato, Italian mezzo-soprano (d. 2010)
 August 10 – Aldo Buzzi, Italian architect, director and screenwriter (d. 2009)

Deaths
 February 14 – Giovanni Passannante, Italian anarchist (b. 1849)
 May 10 – Stanislao Cannizzaro, Italian chemist (b. 1826)
 July 4 – Giovanni Schiaparelli, Italian astronomer (b. 1835)
 November 6 – Giuseppe Cesare Abba, Italian patriot and writer (b. 1838)

References

 
Italy
Years of the 20th century in Italy